The 1994–95 Lebanese Premier League season was the 35th season of the Lebanese Premier League, the top Lebanese professional league for association football clubs in the country, established in 1934.

Ahli Saida and Harakat Shabab joined as the promoted clubs from the 1993–94 Lebanese Second Division. They replaced Shabab Sahel and Riada Wal Adab who were relegated to the 1994–95 Lebanese Second Division. Ansar, the defending champions, won their seventh consecutive—and overall—Lebanese Premier League title.

League table

Top scorers

References

External links
 RSSSF

Leb
1994–95 in Lebanese football
Lebanese Premier League seasons